The Supreme Court of Republika Srpska is the court of last resort in Republika Srpska. The Supreme Court of Republika Srpska was established on the basis of Article 135 of the Constitution of Republika Srpska, by a decision of the National Assembly on 12 August 1992.

References 

Courts in Bosnia and Herzegovina
Courts and tribunals established in 1992